Kentucky Gentleman is a brand of  whiskey produced by the Sazerac Company at its Barton 1792 distillery in Bardstown, Kentucky. The brand is sold as a blend of 51% straight bourbon and 49% neutral grain spirits and bottled at 40% alcohol by volume (80 U.S. proof). It is not a bourbon, rather it is a blend of bourbon and other grain-spirits. 
It is a relatively inexpensive brand.

Reviews
 Whiskey Reviewer: "The phrase 'Kentucky Gentleman' implies a certain Southern genteelness, and frankly, no one possessed with such grace and class would ever stoop to drinking anything resembling Kentucky Gentleman whiskey." 
 Cracked.com: "The concept of mixing nearly equal parts of bourbon and grain alcohol appealed to a demographic of bourbon lovers who do not want any recollection whatsoever of the night before. Its cheap price and convenient pint, liter, and half gallon sizes appeal to many college students and mobile home residents throughout the United States."

Russian import ban
In August 2014, the Russian consumer protection agency Rospotrebnadzor announced that it had detected signs of organic chemicals called phthalates in Kentucky Gentleman and that importation of the brand into Russia would therefore be suspended. However, it has been suggested that the importation ban on Kentucky Gentleman should be viewed in the context of a broader dispute between the U.S. and Russia over trade in a wide variety of products as well as other issues such as the governance of Ukraine.

References

External links
 

Bourbon whiskey
Sazerac Company brands
Bardstown, Kentucky